Janet Campbell may refer to:
Janet Aitken Campbell (1908–1988), first wife of Ian Campbell, 11th Duke of Argyll
Janet Mary Campbell (1877–1954), British physician and medical writer
Janet Campbell Hale (born 1946), Native American writer
Jessie Campbell (1827–1907), Jessie (Janet) Campbell, promoter of higher education for women in Scotland
Janet Campbell (baseball), All-American Girls Professional Baseball League player